László Surján (born 7 September 1941 in Kolozsvár, (now Cluj-Napoca, Romania) is a Hungarian politician and Member of the European Parliament (MEP) with the FIDESZ from 2004 to 2014.

He was the president of the Christian Democratic People's Party (Hungary) political party from 1994-1998. He remained a member of the party to this day.

Surján was a substitute for the Committee on Regional Development and a vice-chair of the Delegation to the EU-Chile Joint Parliamentary Committee.

He was a signatory of the Prague Declaration on European Conscience and Communism.

Education
 1969: General practitioner
 1969: Professor's assistant, Institute of Histology, Budapest University of Medicine
 University of Further Medical Training

Career
 1990–1995: Chairman of the Christian Democratic Party
 1995–1997 and since 2001: Vice-Chairman
 1992–1998: Vice-President of the EUCD (European Union of Christian Democrats)
 1994–1998: Chairman of the Employment Committee of the Hungarian Parliament
 1998–2002: Vice-Chairman of the Foreign Affairs Committee
 1990–1994: Minister of Welfare
 1999–2004: Deputy leader, Group of the European People's Party, Parliamentary Assembly of the Council of Europe
 2000–2001: Head, Hungarian delegation (1998-2002), Deputy Speaker, Hungarian Parliament
 2004–2014: Member of the European Parliament
 Member of the bureau, EPP-ED group (since 2004), Vice-Chairman of the Delegation for Relations with Chile
 since 2012: Vice-President of the European Parliament

Personal life
He is married to Lászlóné Surján, they have together three children - two daughters, Zsófia Margit and Orsolya Katalin as well as a son, László György.

See also
 2004 European Parliament election in Hungary

References

External links
 
 

1941 births
Living people
Christian Democratic People's Party (Hungary) politicians
Fidesz politicians
Fidesz MEPs
MEPs for Hungary 2004–2009
MEPs for Hungary 2009–2014
Members of the National Assembly of Hungary (1990–1994)
Members of the National Assembly of Hungary (1994–1998)
Members of the National Assembly of Hungary (1998–2002)
Members of the National Assembly of Hungary (2002–2006)